Marco Marxer (born 2 June 1999) is a Liechtensteiner footballer who currently plays for Höchst.

International career
He is a member of the Liechtenstein national football team, making his debut in a 2022–23 UEFA Nations League match against Andorra on 10 June 2022. Marxer also made four appearances for the Liechtenstein U21.

References

1999 births
Living people
Liechtenstein footballers
Association football defenders
Liechtenstein international footballers
FC Vaduz players